Dunorlan is a locality and small rural community in the local government area of Meander Valley in the North West region of Tasmania.
The 2016 census determined a population of 108 for the state suburb of Dunorlan.

History
The locality was named for Dunorlan Park in England, a property that was developed by Henry Reed, an early settler in the district.

Geography
The Mersey River forms part of the south-west boundary.

Road infrastructure
The C163 route (Bengeo Road) enters the locality from the north-east, runs south through the unbounded locality of Bengeo, and exits to the south-east. The C161 route (Dunorlan Road) starts at an intersection with route C163 and runs west across the locality to the village of Dunorlan. Here it turns north and follows the railway line until it exits. The C160 route (Weegena Road) starts at an intersection in the village and runs west until it exits.

References

Localities of Meander Valley Council
Towns in Tasmania